The 2012 FIA European Truck Racing Championship was a motor racing championship using highly tuned tractor units producing over 1000 bhp. It was the 28th year of the championship and Jochen Hahn won the title for the second year with MAN.

Teams and drivers

Calendar and winners

Championship standings

Drivers Championship
Points were awarded on a 20, 15, 12, 10, 8, 6, 4, 3, 2, 1 basis to the top 10 finishers in races 1 & 3 of each meeting; and on a 10, 9, 8, 7, 6, 5, 4, 3, 2, 1 basis to the top 10 finishers in races 2 & 4 of each meeting. All scores counted towards the championship.

Teams' Championship
Points were awarded on the same scale as the Drivers' Championship, with non-registered teams being ignored.

External links 

TruckRacing.de 

European Truck Racing Championship seasons
European Truck Racing Championship
Truck Racing Championship